Andrew J. Applegate (October 14, 1833 – August 21, 1870) was a lawyer, officer in the Union Army during the American Civil War, and served as the first Lieutenant Governor of Alabama during Reconstruction. A Republican, Applegate served with Governor William H. Smith of the same political party, from 1868 to 1870.

Early life
A son of Benjamin and Rebecca Applegate, he grew up on a farm near Georgetown, Ohio. His father's family had emigrated from Holland, settling in  Pennsylvania and then Kentucky, until finally moving to Ohio. Applegate was educated within the public schools at Georgetown, where he later studied and practiced law.

Civil War
During the American Civil War, Applegate enlisted for one year on July 9, 1861, as a wagoner in the Fourth Independent Company, Ohio Cavalry, but soon became its quartermaster sergeant. In March 1865, he was commissioned captain of Company H, 189th Ohio Infantry. Too late to see combat action, his regiment was sent to Alabama to serve on occupation duty.

Post-war career
After his discharge, Applegate returned home to Ohio and brought his family to Huntsville, Alabama where he opened a law practice. In 1867, he was elected  on a "Republican Union" ticket with Lafayette Robinson and Columbus Jones to serve as delegates to the Constitutional Convention to frame a new State constitution. Republicans supported African American voting and civil rights and were referred to as Radical Republicans. In the election under that constitution, Applegate was Alabama's first and only elected lieutenant governor on August 13, 1868. He moved to Mobile, Alabama and served Alabama two years as lieutenant governor. He died of mysterious causes in Chattanooga two years later.

References

External links
Findagrave entry

Lieutenant Governors of Alabama
1833 births
1870 deaths
People from Georgetown, Ohio
Politicians from Huntsville, Alabama
Quartermasters
Alabama Republicans
Union Army officers
American people of Dutch descent
People of Ohio in the American Civil War
Radical Republican Party politicians
19th-century American politicians
Military personnel from Huntsville, Alabama
Lawyers from Huntsville, Alabama
19th-century American lawyers